West is the fourth solo album by the American Music Club singer/songwriter Mark Eitzel, released by Warner Bros. Records in 1997. It includes songs co-written and produced by the R.E.M. guitarist Peter Buck from October 15 to October 17, 1996.

Critical reception
The Chicago Tribune wrote that "with Buck producing and co-writing West, Eitzel has never been part of such an overtly inviting pop album."

Track listing
All songs written by Buck and Eitzel, except where noted:
"If You Have to Ask" – 4:20
"Free of Harm" – 3:21
"Helium" – 5:25
"Stunned & Frozen" – 5:10
"Then It Really Happens" – 4:28
"In Your Life" –  4:04
"Lower Eastside Tourist" – 3:49
"Three Inches of Wall" – 4:48
"Move Myself Ahead" – 3:35
"Old Photographs" – 5:22
"Fresh Screwdriver" – 3:59
"Live or Die" (Eitzel) – 5:14

Personnel
Mark Eitzel – vocals, guitar on "Live or Die", string arrangements on "If You Have to Ask"
Steve Berlin – fuzz bass on "Old Photographs", piano on "Helium"
Peter Buck – guitar, bass guitar on "Live or Die"
Bruce Kaphan – string arrangements on "If You Have to Ask"
Barrett Martin – drums, acoustic bass guitar, bass marimba, vibes, tablas, conga, tambourine
Scott McCaughey – electric bass, organ, piano, slide guitar
Mike McCready – guitar on "Fresh Screwdriver"
Skerik – vibraphone, organ, baritone saxophone

See also
The Lonesome Death of Buck McCoy, a studio album by The Minus 5 featuring many of the same musicians and recorded at the same time as West

References

External links
"Power Trio", in the Phoenix New Times (July 12, 1997)

1997 albums
Albums produced by Peter Buck
Mark Eitzel albums
Warner Records albums